Francis Ralph Valeo (January 30, 1916 – April 9, 2006) was the Secretary of the United States Senate and ex officio member of the Federal Election Commission. He was the defendant/appellee for the federal government of the United States in Buckley v. Valeo, 424 U.S. 1 (1976), in which the Supreme Court of the United States upheld federal limits on and disclosure requirements for campaign contributions but struck down limits on campaign and independent expenditures.

Life
Valeo was the son of a shoe factory foreman. He was born in Brooklyn, New York. He was a 1936 political science graduate of New York University, where he also received a master's degree in international relations in 1942. He served in China during World War II.

After the war, he was a foreign policy specialist for the Legislative Reference Service of the Library of Congress, and was loaned to the staff of the Senate Foreign Relations Committee. He traveled repeatedly to Southeast Asia with Montana Senator Mike Mansfield. In 1963, after the Bobby Baker scandal shook the Senate, Mansfield appointed Valeo to replace Baker as Majority Secretary, a position he held during the long filibuster over the Civil Rights Act of 1964. In 1965 he was elected Secretary of the Senate. In 1973, he travelled to Wilmington, Delaware to swear in Joe Biden as a Senator at the Delaware Division of the Wilmington Medical Center. Biden was caring for his two sons following a car crash that killed his wife and infant daughter two weeks earlier.

Valeo's books include The Japanese Diet and the U.S. Congress (1983) and Mike Mansfield, Majority Leader: A Different Kind of Senate, 1961–1976 (1999).

Sources
Senate Website
Washington Post Obituary

1916 births
2006 deaths
People from Brooklyn
Secretaries of the United States Senate
Members of the Federal Election Commission